Labette County (county code LB) is a county located in Southeast Kansas. As of the 2020 census, the county population was 20,184. Its county seat is Oswego, and its most populous city is Parsons. The county was named after LaBette creek, the second-largest creek in the county, which runs roughly NNW-SSE from near Parsons to Chetopa. The creek in turn was named after French-Canadian fur trapper Pierre LaBette who had moved to the area, living along the Neosho River, and marrying into the Osage tribe in the 1830s and 1840s.

History
In the 1840s Labette County had a population mainly consisting of Osage people, although there were also many Cherokee and Euro-Americans.  Many of the Euro-Americans were merchants with Osage or Cherokee wives.

Between 1871 and 1873, at least eleven people vanished in the vicinity of an inn and general store operated by the Bender family in Labette County.  Following the disappearance of the Benders in 1873, it was discovered that they had apparently murdered a number of travellers.  Between eight and eleven bodies were discovered buried on the premises.  Governor Thomas A. Osborn offered a reward of $2,000 for the apprehension of the Benders, but they were never found.

Geography

Adjacent counties
 Neosho County (north)
 Crawford County (northeast)
 Cherokee County (east)
 Craig County, Oklahoma (south)
 Nowata County, Oklahoma (southwest)
 Montgomery County (west)

Demographics

The Parsons, KS Micropolitan Statistical Area includes all of Labette County.

As of the 2010 Census Labette County had a population of 21,607.  The median age was 41.  The racial and ethnic composition of the population was 85.5% non-Hispanic white, 4.7% African-American, 2.2% Native America, 0.4% Asian, 0.1% non-Hispanics of some other race, 3.6% non-Hispanics reporting two or more races and 4.0% Hispanic or Latino.

As of the 2000 census, there were 22,835 people, 9,194 households, and 6,114 families residing in the county. There were 10,306 housing units at an average density of 16 per square mile (6/km2). The racial makeup of the county was 89.28% White, 4.66% Black or African American, 1.95% Native American, 0.32% Asian, 0.01% Pacific Islander, 1.20% from other races, and 2.58% from two or more races. Hispanic or Latino of any race were 3.07% of the population.

There were 9,194 households, out of which 31.20% had children under the age of 18 living with them, 52.10% were married couples living together, 10.20% had a female householder with no husband present, and 33.50% were non-families. 29.80% of all households were made up of individuals, and 14.30% had someone living alone who was 65 years of age or older.  The average household size was 2.39 and the average family size was 2.95.

In the county, the population was spread out, with 25.70% under the age of 18, 8.70% from 18 to 24, 25.80% from 25 to 44, 22.50% from 45 to 64, and 17.30% who were 65 years of age or older.  The median age was 38 years. For every 100 females, there were 95.70 males.  For every 100 females age 18 and over, there were 92.00 males.

The median income for a household in the county was $30,875, and the median income for a family was $37,519. Males had a median income of $29,043 versus $21,706 for females. The per capita income for the county was $15,525.  About 8.90% of families and 12.70% of the population were below the poverty line, including 14.70% of those under age 18 and 11.90% of those age 65 or over.

Government

Presidential elections
Similar to most Kansas counties Labette County is primarily Republican, but has a slight Democratic lean to it like many counties in Southeast Kansas. While Jimmy Carter & Bill Clinton both won the county once each, it has shifted strongly away from the Democratic Party, with Hillary Clinton garnering the lowest percentage since 1928.

Laws
Following amendment to the Kansas Constitution in 1986, the county remained a prohibition, or "dry", county until 1996, when voters approved the sale of alcoholic liquor by the individual drink with a 30% food sales requirement.

Education

Colleges
 Labette Community College

Unified school districts
 Parsons USD 503
 Oswego USD 504 
 Chetopa–St. Paul USD 505
 Labette County USD 506

District Office In Neighboring County
 Southeast USD 247

Communities

Cities

 Altamont
 Bartlett
 Chetopa
 Edna
 Labette
 Mound Valley
 Oswego (county seat) 
 Parsons

Unincorporated communities
 Angola
 Dennis
 Montana
 Strauss
 Valeda

Townships
Labette County is divided into sixteen townships.  The cities of Chetopa, Oswego, and Parsons are considered governmentally independent and are excluded from the census figures for the townships.  In the following table, the population center is the largest city (or cities) included in that township's population total, if it is of a significant size.

See also
 National Register of Historic Places listings in Labette County, Kansas

References

Notes

Further reading

 History of Labette County, Kansas, and Representative Citizens; Nelson Case; Biographical Publishing Co; 846 pages; 1901.
 Atlas and Plat Book of Labette County, Kansas; Geo. A. Ogle & Co; 40 pages; 1916.
 Standard Atlas of Labette County, Kansas; Kenyon Company; 53 pages; 1906.

External links

County
 
 Labette County - Directory of Public Officials
Historical
 Labette County History and Heritage Project, Genealogy
Maps
 Labette County Maps: Current, Historic, KDOT
 Kansas Highway Maps: Current, Historic, KDOT
 Kansas Railroad Maps: Current, 1996, 1915, KDOT and Kansas Historical Society

 
Kansas counties
1867 establishments in Kansas
Populated places established in 1867
Micropolitan areas of Kansas